Georges Daumezon (3 June 1912 – 6 May 1979) was a French psychiatrist.

1912 births
1979 deaths
French psychiatrists
20th-century French physicians